The Symmocinae are a subfamily of moths in the superfamily Gelechioidea. These small moths are found mainly in the Palearctic and Africa.

In modern treatments, they are usually united with the concealer moth family Autostichidae.

History of classification
They have traditionally been considered close relatives of the Blastobasidae, where they were sometimes included as subfamily Symmocinae. In arrangements that include the former in the case-bearer family (Coleophoridae) as subfamily Blastobasinae, the Symmocidae were usually treated as tribe Symmocini. Alternatively, they have been united with the Holcopogonidae; in such a treatment the combined group is typically not included in the concealer moth family (Oecophoridae) but treated as distinct family Autostichidae or Symmocidae, with the respective subfamilies downranked to tribes. Another group proposed to be a close relative is the Xyloryctinae, usually included in the Oecophoridae wherever the Symmocidae are. More recently, with additional data and molecular phylogenetic analyses becoming available, the Symmocidae are reinstated as a family in their own right, pending further study of gelechioid interrelationships.

Regardless of their systematic position and taxonomic rank, the group was usually divided into two groups, one centered on Oegoconia and the other encompassing those genera closer to Symmoca. The former is called Oegoconiinae or Oegoconiini and the latter Symmocinae or Symmocini, depending on whether the overall group is treated as family or subfamily. While the overall circumscription and the relationships of the Symmocidae are essentially unresolved, the Oegoconiinae-Symmocinae subdivision seems to be quite well warranted.

Taxonomy and systematics
Genera of Symmocinae are:

Symmocini

 Ambloma Walsingham, [1908]
 Amselina Gozmány, 1957
 Apiletria Lederer, 1855
 Aprominta Gozmány, 1957
 Catasphalma Gozmány, 1957
 Chersogenes Walsingham, 1908
 Donaspastus Gozmány, 1952
 Dysspastus Gozmány, 1964
 Epanastasis Walsingham, 1908
 Metaxitagma Gozmány, 1985
 Nukusa Gozmány, 1963
 Orpecacantha Gozmány, 2008
 Orpecovalva Gozmány, 1964
 Pantacordis Gozmány, 1954
 Stibaromacha Meyrick, 1928
 Symmoca Hübner, 1825
 Symmocoides Amsel, 1939
 Telephirca Gozmány, 1957

Unknown placement

 Acrosyntaxis Gozmány, 1957
 Afrosymmoca Gozmány, 1966
 Aspronympha Gozmány, 2008
 Chionellidea Amsel, 1940
 Concordaxis Gozmány, 2008
 Cornusymmoca Gozmány, 1965
 Dyscordaxis Gozmány, 1975
 Eremica Walsingham, 1904
 Eremicamura Gozmány, 1962
 Gerdana Busck, 1908
 Hecestoptera Gozmány, 1961
 Hieronala Gozmány, 1963
 Indiospastus Gozmány, 1967
 Kertomesis Gozmány, 1962
 Kullashara Gozmány, 1963
 Leilaptera Gozmány, 1963
 Morotripta Meyrick, 1917
 Mylothra Meyrick, 1907
 Nastoceras Chrétien in Oberthür, 1922
 Nestorellus Gerasimov, 1930
 †Oegoconiites Kusnetsov, 1941
 Pecteneremus Gozmány, 1963
 Sagarancona Gozmány, 1964
 Sceptea Walsingham, 1911
 Serendipitia Gozmány, 2008
 Spinitibia Lee & Brown, 2010
 Symmacantha Gozmány, 1963
 †Symmocites Kusnetsov, 1941
 Synchordaxis Gozmány, 2008
 Syssymmoca Gozmány, 1963
 Taygete Chambers, 1873
 Tenieta Amsel, 1942
 Xenoplaxa Gozmány, 1963

Ambloma is sometimes placed in the Symmocinae, but others consider it a member of the Gelechiidae.

Footnotes

References

  (2008): Australian Faunal Directory – Symmocidae. Version of 2008-OCT-09. Retrieved 2010-APR-29.
  (2009): Symmocinae [sic]. Version 2.1, 2009-DEC-22. Retrieved 2010-APR-29.
  (2001): Markku Savela's Lepidoptera and some other life forms – Symmocinae [sic]. Version of 2001-NOV-08. Retrieved 2010-APR-29.
  (2008): Coleophoridae. Version of 2008-MAY-01. Retrieved 2010-APR-28.

 
Autostichidae
Moth subfamilies